Lore Baudrit (born 11 October 1991) is a French ice hockey player and member of the French national team, currently playing with for Linköping HC Dam of the Swedish Women's Hockey League (SDHL). She played part of the 2018–19 season with IF Björklöven in the DamEttan before signing with Modo.

She represented France at the 2019 IIHF Women's World Championship, where she served as alternate captain.

Career statistics

Regular season and playoffs

References

External links

1991 births
Living people
French expatriate ice hockey people
French expatriate sportspeople in Canada
French expatriate sportspeople in Sweden
French women's ice hockey forwards
Les Canadiennes de Montreal players
Montreal Carabins women's ice hockey players
People from Castres
Modo Hockey Dam players
IF Björklöven players
Sportspeople from Tarn (department)